Bagoud is a village in Dhamtari District in the Indian state of Chhattisgarh, about  from Kurud. Bagoud has an average elevation of 298 metres (977 feet). It is situated near the national highway 30, nearly 53 km away from state capital Raipur and 3km from national highway. New Generation Organization (Rekhram Sahu)

References 

Cities and towns in Dhamtari district